Hans von Mžik (1876–1961) was an Austrian orientalist and geographer. Starting in 1921 he was head of the map collection at the Austrian National Library and co-founder of the series Museion.

Selected publications 
 1911. Die reise des Arabers Ibn Baṭūṭa durch Indien und China (14. jahrhundert) bearbeitet von dr. Hans von Mžik. Hamburg, Gutenberg-verlag.

References 
 Bibliographie der Schriften des Universitätsprofessors Dr. Hans von Mzik, zu seinem 60.Geburtstage dargebracht von Freunden, Kollegen und vom Verlag. Wien: Gerold 1936

External links 
Literature of Hans von Mžik in the catalog of SUB Göttingen
List of literature in the online catalog the Staatsbibliothek zu Berlin

Austrian geographers
Austrian orientalists
1876 births
1961 deaths
Orientalists from the Austro-Hungarian Empire